Dario Nicoletti (born 7 March 1967, in Mariano Comense) is an Italian former cyclist, who was professional from 1991 to 1997.

Major results
1990
 1st GP Palio del Recioto
 1st Piccolo Giro di Lombardia
1991
 1st Giro di Campania
1997
 1st Stage 2 Hofbrau Cup (TTT)

Grand Tour general classification results timeline

References

External links

1967 births
Living people
Italian male cyclists
Cyclists from the Province of Como